Liz Brunner is an American journalist, an award-winning television news anchor, reporter, author, and the CEO of Brunner Communications. Brunner has worked at WCIA-TV Champaign-Urbana, IL, WTVT-TV Tampa, FL, and WCVB-TV, Boston, MA where she served as a main news anchor and reporter. In 2013, she founded Brunner Communications, a firm that specializes in media training, communications coaching, and consulting.

Early years
Brunner was born in Hartford, Connecticut, to Mary (née Chacko) Russell, a retired medical social worker, and Rev. Galen E. Russell Jr., a Pastor of the United Church of Christ. Chacko, born and raised in India, met Russell in Japan, where Russell's parents served as missionaries.

She was raised along with her three younger brothers in Hawaii and Pekin, Illinois.   Brunner graduated from Pekin High School and in 1979, competed in the Miss America Pageant as Miss Illinois.

Brunner attended and earned a Bachelor of Music Degree from Lawrence University's Conservatory of Music in Appleton, Wisconsin.  Upon graduation, Brunner became a music teacher in Richton Park, Illinois.  Additionally, she sang semi-professionally with the Park Forest Singers and performed for Pope John Paul II at the Vatican.  After leaving music, Brunner worked for Caren Charles and was among the company's top sales associates.

Her family's ancestry has been traced back to William Morse and William Brewster.

Career 
In 1985, Brunner took her first job in television at the CBS affiliate WCIA-TV in Champaign-Urbana, Illinois, serving as community relations coordinator. She then joined WTVT-TV, Tampa Bay's CBS affiliate (now a Fox station) as the director of community relations. Within a year, Brunner was named co-anchor of the early morning news.  In 1991, Brunner was awarded the "Up and Comers Award" from the American Women in Radio and Television, now called, the Alliance for Women in Media. 

After five years in Tampa, Brunner was hired by WCVB-TV, Channel 5, the ABC affiliate in Boston, as correspondent and fill-in anchor for its news magazine show, Chronicle.  Brunner then moved into a full-time role in Channel 5's news department becoming the 5:30 and 11pm anchor.  Later, Brunner was selected to fill the space vacated by long-time Boston news anchor, Natalie Jacobson, as the 6pm NewsCenter 5 Anchor.

Brunner serves as the Executive Vice President of American Women in Radio and Television, Boston chapter.

In October 2013, Brunner departed from her 20-year post as a main anchor for NewsCenter 5, WCVB-TV.  She has since launched Brunner Communications, a firm that specializes in media training and communications coaching.

Brunner released her first book through GracePoint Publishing in November of 2021, entitled Dare To Own You. The memoir follows Brunner's career journey along with the challenges faced and impactful lessons she learned through her upbringing and being a woman in her field.

Awards
Two-time winner of a New England Emmy by the National Academy of Television Arts and Sciences
Edward R. Murrow Award
Associated Press Award
Two Gracies from the American Women in Media
1994 winner of Boston Magazine's "Best Newcomer to Boston Media"

References

Further reading 
 Zwirn, Lisa, "At Home with Liz Brunner: A news anchor's artsy side veers from the script", The Boston Globe, September 29, 2005

External links 
LizBrunner.com
BrunnerAcademy.com
Live Your Best Life with Liz Brunner - Podcast
GracePoint Publishing: Liz Brunner Author Bio
The Boston Channel: Liz Brunner bio

American women journalists
1959 births
Living people
People from Pekin, Illinois
People from Cook County, Illinois
21st-century American women